Al-Zubaidi is an Arab surname. They are one of the largest Arab families. Notable people with the surname include:

 Aidarus al-Zubaidi (born 1967), Yemeni leader
 Ali Al-Zubaidi (footballer, born 1986), Saudi footballer
 Ali Al-Zubaidi (footballer, born 1993), Saudi footballer
 Ibrahim Al-Zubaidi (born 1989), Saudi footballer
 Mohammed Al-Zubaidi (born 1997), Saudi footballer
 Bariq Abdullah Hontaa al-Zubaidi (1950–1991), Iraqi army general